Felix Vincent Stephensen (born 22 July 1990) is a Norwegian semi-professional poker player currently residing in London, England known for being the runner-up finisher to Martin Jacobson in the 2014 World Series of Poker. He has earned over $300,000 playing online poker playing under the alias "FallAtyourFeet".

Poker career
Stephensen is primarily an online Pot Limit Omaha cash game specialist playing stakes up to $25/$50 and on rare occasions $200/$400.

Prior to the 2014 WSOP, Stephensen had only two tournament cashes for a total of $22,118. He was in London with no intention of entering any events, but then miraculously won a $1000 World Cup parlay bet on the Netherlands beating Australia precisely 3-2 with 60 to 1 odds. Netherlands defeated Australia 3-2 and Stephensen cashed for $60,000.

With his new fortune Stephensen flew to Las Vegas, entered the WSOP Main Event, and ended up finishing runner up to Martin Jacobson losing to Jacobson's  with his  after moving all in pre-flop. The board ran out . It is believed that Stephensen would be taxed 50% of his WSOP winnings if he were to return to Norway.

As of 2014, his total live tournament winnings exceed $5,100,000 most of which has come from his runner-up cash in the 2014 WSOP Main Event.

References

External links
 Felix Stephensen Hendon Mob profile

1990 births
Living people
Sportspeople from Oslo
Norwegian poker players
Norwegian expatriates in the United Kingdom